"Bing Bang Boom" is a song written by Hugh Prestwood, and recorded by American country music band Highway 101.  It was released in April 1991 as the first single and title track from their album Bing Bang Boom.  The song reached number 14 on the Billboard Hot Country Singles & Tracks chart in June 1991.

Music video
The music video was directed by Gerry Wenner/Michael Salomon and premiered in 1991.

Chart performance

References

1991 singles
Highway 101 songs
Warner Records singles
Songs written by Hugh Prestwood
Song recordings produced by Paul Worley
1991 songs